Mrs Willie James (born Evelyn Elizabeth Forbes; 1867–1929), was known in the late Victorian and Edwardian period as the hostess of house parties and shooting weekends at the West Dean House country estate in Sussex, England.  Frequent guests included Albert Edward, Prince of Wales, who acted as godfather to her son, Edward James.

She was the eldest daughter of Helen Moncreiffe and Sir Charles Forbes, 4th Baronet of Newe. Their estate, Castle Newe, was adjacent to Balmoral Castle, the Scottish residence of Queen Victoria and Prince Albert. The two families knew each other and Evelyn became a friend to their son Edward, Prince of Wales (Edward VII).

In 1889 she married William Dodge James, who was the son of a wealthy merchant and they purchased West Dean House in the village of West Dean, West Sussex, England. She became known as Mrs Willie James and was one of the great hostesses of the period, often entertaining the Prince of Wales as a guest, and other notables including the King of Spain. She and Willie James had five children, four daughters and a son — Edward William Frank James, whose godfather was Edward VII. Her daughter Audrey Evelyn James Coats married Marshall Field III.

After the death of her husband in 1912, Evelyn married Major John Chaytor Brinton; the marriage was annulled in 1927. Evelyn died in 1929 following an operation and was buried in West Dean cemetery.

References 

1867 births
1929 deaths
19th-century Scottish women
20th-century Scottish women
Scottish socialites
People from West Dean, West Sussex
People from Aberdeenshire

External links

  1978 George Melly interviews with Edward James